Geopora sumneriana is a species of European fungus belonging to the family Pyronemataceae.

This fungus forms a rounded brown, roughly hairy ascocarp underground. This fruit body remains subterranean for most of the year but breaks the surface in the spring to form a cream-coloured cup (apothecium) up to 7 cm across and 5 cm tall. This species occurs in small groups and is exclusively found associated with cedar trees.

References

External links

Pyronemataceae
Fungi described in 1876
Fungi of Europe